Thomas Clarkson (1760–1846), the pioneering English  abolitionist, prepared a "map" of the "streams" of "forerunners and coadjutors" of the abolitionist movement, which he published in his work, The History of the Rise, Progress, and Accomplishment of the Abolition of the African Slave-Trade by the British Parliament published in 1808. The map shows streams with various branches that led to the late-eighteenth-century movement that convinced the British Parliament to ban the slave trade. The list below is taken from Clarkson's map.

No women appear to be on the list, although many in fact were involved in the movement including Hannah More, Joanna Baillie, and Anna Laetitia Barbauld. James Oglethorpe does not appear on the list, even though he and other Georgia Trustees prohibited slavery in the Province of Georgia. Oglethorpe later collaborated in opposing the slave trade with Granville Sharp, whom Clarkson describes as "the father of the cause in England". Slavery as both a moral and legal concern arose in the early days of the Georgia Colony, which prohibited slavery in 1735 and was challenged by neighbouring South Carolina, a slaveholding society.

Many others who warrant mention may not be acknowledged in Clarkson's list. A section is provided below for the addition of other forerunners.

Clarkson's list

List of "forerunners and coajutors" on map:

Various forerunners to 1787
Cardinal Ximenes
Charles V, Holy Roman Emperor
Elizabeth I
Pope Leo X
Louis XIII
Hill (Hill's Naval History)
Richard Baxter
Morgan Godwyn
Southern (poet)
Thomas Tryon
Richard Steele
Dr. Primatt
Montesquieu
Alexander Pope
James Thomson
Francis Hutcheson
John Atkins
Rousseau
Richard Savage
Foster
Griffith Hughes
Wallis
Bishop Hayter
William Shenstone
John Dyer
Edmund Burke
Adam Smith
Malachi Postlethwaite (not known if this is Malachy Postlethwayt, a defender of African trade)
Laurence Sterne
Thomas Jeffery
William Warburton
Granville Sharp
James Beattie
John Bicknell (Bickness?)
Thomas
John Wesley
David Hartley
Sir George Saville
Abbe Liévin-Bonaventure Proyart
Millan
Robertson
Guillaume Thomas François Raynal
Dr. William Paley
Thomas Day
Bishop Porteus
G. Wakefield
William Cowper
Dr. Gregory
James Ramsay
Jacques Necker
John Chubb and George  White (Bridgewater Petition, 1785)
James Currie
Captain J. S. Smith
William Roscoe
Edward Rushton

Early Quakers in England
George Fox
William Edmundson

Quakers and/or abolitionists in America from 1688 
David Cooper
John Blunston
William Burling
Ralph Sandiford
Benjamin Lay
John Woolman
Quakers of New England, New York, Maryland (mid-1700s)
Anthony Benezet
William Dillwyn
Quakers of Virginia, Carolina, and Georgia:
Warner Mifflin
James Pemberton
George Whitefield
Judge Sewel (Sewall)
Benjamin Rush
Winchester

Various Quakers and/or abolitionists in England and America

Benjamin Franklin
Thomas Jefferson
John Jay
 William Dillwyn
Joseph Woods (Sr.)
Samuel Hoare Jr
George Harrison
Dr. Thomas Knowles
John Lloyd
David Barclay
James Phillips
Joseph Gurney Bevan
 Joseph Hancock, a Wisbech Quaker (helped Clarkson find a publisher for his essay "Is it right to make slaves of others against their will?")

Others, up to 1787
Dr. Peckard
Thomas Clarkson
Bennet Langton
Lord Scarsdale
Dr. Baker
Richard Phillips
Sheldon
Sir Charles Middleton
Sir Herbert Mackworth
William Wilberforce
John Villiers
Powys (Lord Lilford) (possibly 1st baron)
Sir Richard Hill (possibly 2nd Baronet)
Lord Balgonie (Leven)
L. Hawkins Browne

Abolition forerunners not listed on the Clarkson map

Many of the London salons and circles of the 1770s and later took up the cause of antislavery, at least intellectually, thus paving the way for later action. Examples include Johnson's Circle, the Blue Stocking Society, and James Oglethorpe's associates.

Magnus IV of Sweden
Joanna Baillie
Anna Laetitia Barbauld
Samuel Johnson
Hannah More
James Oglethorpe

References

External links
 Thomas Clarkson “map” http://www2.vcdh.virginia.edu/emancipation/TCAbolMap/clarkson.html

 
Pre-emancipation African-American history
Abolitionist
Abolitionists
Slavery-related lists